I is a 2015 Indian Tamil-language romantic action thriller film written and directed by S. Shankar. Produced and distributed by V. Ravichandran under his production company, Aascar Films, the film features Vikram, Amy Jackson and Suresh Gopi in lead roles while Santhanam, Upen Patel, Ojas Rajani (in her film debut) and Ramkumar Ganesan portray pivotal roles. The film tells the story of a rich and handsome bodybuilder and supermodel named Lingesan (played by Vikram), who became a Hunchback by the hands of his enemies by using a Virus. After being deformed, exacts revenge upon those who were responsible for his predicament. Parts of the film were loosely based on The Hunchback of Notre Dame and Beauty and the Beast. The soundtrack and film score were composed by A. R. Rahman.

Production design was handled by T. Muthuraj. P. C. Sreeram was the film's cinematographer and editing was done by Anthony. The visual effects were designed by V. Srinivas Mohan through Rising Sun Pictures. Weta Workshop had worked on the digital and prosthetic make-up and background arts for the film. Principal photography commenced on 15 July 2012. The filming lasted for two years and eight months, during which shooting was done extensively in China. Further schedules were filmed in locations in Chennai, Bangkok, Jodhpur, Kodaikanal, Pollachi, Bangalore and Mysore. The climax train fight scene was shot in the railway stations of Chengalpattu, Rayagada, Berhampur and Visakhapatnam. The film was dubbed and released in Telugu and Hindi along with the original Tamil version.

I was released on 14 January 2015; The film received mostly positive reviews from critics with praise for Shankar's direction, the performances (especially Vikram, Suresh Gopi and Amy Jackson), the technical aspects of the film (especially the visual effects, cinematography, costume design and makeup), and A.R. Rahman's soundtrack and background score, though the length, pace and editing received some criticism. The film was a commercial success, grossing  worldwide, becoming one of the highest grossing Tamil films of all time and Vikram's highest-grossing film. Vikram won the Filmfare Award for Best Actor – Tamil for the film.

Plot 
 
Lingesan is a bodybuilder from Chennai, whose main ambition is to become Mr. India. He wins the title of Mr. Tamil Nadu, which gives him direct entry to the Mr. India pageant. He has a crush on Diya, a leading supermodel. Diya is soon blacklisted, with all her advertisement film contracts cancelled by John, her co-star in all her advertisements, after she constantly rejected his sexual advances. To save her career, Diya decides to replace John with Lingesan, whom she had earlier met at one of her shoots, as her co-star for her next advertisement. The shooting is to take place in China at the same time when the Mr. India pageant is to take place, but Lingesan agrees, sacrificing his Mr. India ambitions in the process.

Lingesan is given a makeover by Diya's stylist, a transgender woman Osma. The shoot initially does not go well as Lingesan is shy and awkward around Diya. On her director's advice, Diya pretends to fall in love with Lingesan so that he would loosen up and perform better during the shoot. The plan proves successful but Diya soon tells Lingesan the truth. Hurt, he focuses on modelling instead of her. They both gradually excel in the modelling industry as the lead pair. As time passes, Diya reciprocates Lingesan's love for her and they soon get engaged.

In his journey from a bodybuilder to a top model, Lingesan became a rich and influential model. But Lingesan got many enemies, including John, whose modelling career was ruined due to Lingesan's rising popularity, forcing him to appear in local advertisements to stay afloat; Osma, who feels love for Lingesan and revealed her feelings to him, only to be rejected; advertisement company owner Indrakumar, whose company suffered losses when Lingesan refused to endorse their soft drink as it was reported to contain pesticides; and another bodybuilder Ravi, who also competed for the Mr. Tamil Nadu title but lost to Lingesan despite pressurizing the latter to withdraw. These four people conspire to take revenge on Lingesan and destroy his fame and modelling career.

Two days before his wedding, Lingesan slowly starts to experience hair and teeth loss and a skin disorder. He consults his friend Vasudevan, a doctor who is also the guardian of Diya's family. Vasudevan claims that he is suffering from a rare and incurable genetic disease that results in premature ageing. Lingesan's condition worsens, with his face and body deforming, and eventually, he becomes a hunchback. In his current condition, Lingesan decides to disappear from the public eye and also from Diya's life by faking his death in a car accident. Only his friend Babu and Vasudevan know that he is alive. Nobody is ready to marry Diya due to her past with Lingesan. Lingesan asks Vasudevan to marry Diya as he is the only person who will be able to understand Diya's past and present situation. Vasudevan agrees and the wedding is fixed.

On the eve of Diya's wedding, another doctor named Thiruvengadam reveals to Lingesan that, contrary to Vasudevan's claims, he is actually suffering from H4N2 influenza, caused by the "I" virus, which can only be transmitted by injection. Lingesan discovers that John, Osma, Indrakumar, Ravi and, to his horror, even Vasudevan, are responsible for injecting the virus into his body. Vasudevan has loved Diya since she was 10 years old and was enraged when she chose Lingesan over him. So, he sided with Lingesan's enemies and planned the entire operation to have Lingesan injected with the virus. Lingesan is then beaten up by them and tied up, but manages to escape later. Enraged and betrayed, Lingesan abducts Diya on the wedding day and keeps her safely in an old house without revealing his identity to her.

Aided by Babu, Lingesan decides to take revenge on those who had deformed him by disfiguring them without killing them. He first immolates Ravi, who suffers severe burns. He then prepares a paste which he mixes with Osma's daily cosmetic products and unbeknownst to her she applies it on her body, causing her body to sprout huge growths of hair. Next, he douses Indrakumar with sugar syrup which causes a swarm of bees to sting him all over his body. He lures John to fight over a moving train and gets him electrocuted. Finally, he gets Vasudevan to unwittingly inject "I" virus into himself three-four times, causing his whole body to swell up. After achieving his revenge, Lingesan reveals his condition to Diya, who, though initially taken aback, still loves him despite his deformity. They decide to live a secluded life together. Lingesan undergoes ayurvedic treatment, yoga and physiotherapy for his condition and soon returns to normal.

Cast

 Vikram as Lingesan "Lee", a bodybuilder-turned supermodel
 Amy Jackson as Diya, a supermodel and Lingesan's love interest (Voice dubbed by Raveena Ravi)
 Suresh Gopi as Dr. Vasudevan, Diya's family doctor and guardian-turned traitor
 Santhanam as Babu, Lingesan's best friend
 Upen Patel as John, another supermodel who loses his fame because of Lingesan's rise
 G. Ramkumar as Indrakumar
 Ojas Rajani as Osma Jasmine, a transgender makeup artist
 M. Kamaraj as Ravi, another bodybuilder
 Mahru Sheikh as Diya's Mother
 Azhagu as Lingesan's father
 T. K. Kala as Lingesan's mother
 Mohan Kapoor as Sushil, ad film director
 Srinivasan as Keerthivasan (guest appearance)
 Yogi Babu as Keerthivasan's fan (guest appearance)
 Alfred Hsing as John's henchman
 Hello Kandasamy
 R. Sarathkumar in a cameo appearance as himself

Production

Origin
In an interview with the Tamil channel Sun TV, held shortly after the release of Enthiran in October 2010, the film's lead actor Rajinikanth revealed that Shankar had approached and pitched three storylines for him to consider for his next venture, 15 years ago, post the release of his directorial, the Kamal Haasan-starrer Indian (1996). Rajinikanth was impressed with two of the scripts and agreed to star in the films, which became Sivaji (2007) and Enthiran (2010). The third script narrated by Shankar was centered on an aspiring bodybuilder who would later turn into a deformed hunchback following a freak accident. Rajinikanth was sceptical of it and refused it. Following the release of Nanban (2012), Shankar revived the project with Vikram in the lead, his second collaboration with the actor after Anniyan (2005).

Development
Shankar collaborated with writer-duo Suresh and Balakrishnan, to work on the script of his next film. His norm collaborator A. R. Rahman was signed in to compose the soundtrack album and background score for the film, working with Shankar for the tenth time. P. C. Sreeram was confirmed to do the film's cinematography in his maiden association with the actor. Action choreographer Peter Hein was initially roped in the project, but he had to back out, due to commitments with S. S. Rajamouli's film Baahubali (2015). As a result, Martial arts choreographer Yuen Woo-ping was selected for handling the stunt sequences. Additional stunt direction and supervision was done by Anl Arasu. VFX company Rising Sun Pictures under visual effects designer V. Srinivas Mohan was selected to provide the special effects in motion filming, while Indian film production designer T. Muthuraj was confirmed as the film's art director. In May 2012, Shankar visited New Zealand and met filmmaker Peter Jackson and Richard Taylor's special effects and prop company Weta Workshop. Sean Foot and Davina Lamont provided the prosthetic makeup for Vikram's beast get-up in the film and additional prosthetic makeup was done by Christien Tinsley and Dominie Till. Gavin Miguel and Mary E. Vogt were in charge of the costume designing of the film's cast.

The film was earlier reported to be titled as either Thendral or Therdal, while Azhagan and Aanazhagan were also used as alternate titles that Shankar had kept in mind. Since they were already used in the Tamil films released during 1991 and 1995, Shankar decided that a single alphabet would be the film's title. In mid-2012, the team confirmed that the project would be titled I. According to The Times of India, Shankar opted for the title I as he thought it "explains all the characteristics of the protagonist"; the word has a variety of meanings, which include "king, beauty, astonishment, guru, vulnerability, owner and arrow". The film's title got the name, as in the film, Lingesan (Vikram's character) was deformed due to H4N2 Influenza caused by the "I" virus that had transmitted due to an injection.

Casting
In April 2012, Vikram was selected to feature in the lead role. Priyanka Chopra was initially reported to be in talks for the female lead. Later, Asin's name was suggested along with Chopra. It was reported that Deepika Padukone was also approached, but she denied her involvement in the film. Model-turned-actress Evelyn Sharma eventually selected for the female lead, by an audition, but had opted out due to language reasons. She claimed this in an interview, more than a week after the film's release. Samantha Ruth Prabhu was then signed on, but she had opted out of the project citing scheduling conflicts. The role finally went to Amy Jackson, who was paid  for acting in the film. Raveena Ravi dubbed the voice for her role. Santhanam, Upen Patel, Srinivasan and Suresh Gopi were selected to play the principal supporting characters in the film. Ramkumar Ganesan, a leading film producer and the elder son of the late-Tamil thespian Sivaji Ganesan, was also added to the cast to play a pivotal role in the film. Jiiva was considered for portraying the antagonist, but was unable to accept the offer due to his prior commitments. Hollywood actor Arnold Schwarzenegger was reported to play an award presenter for a brief scene. Ravichandran, however, denied the news, but said that he would appear in the audio launch of the film. To prepare for his role in I, Vikram took some weight loss and gain tips from Arnold as well. Make-up artiste Ojas M. Rajani, who previously worked with Shankar in Anniyan, was reported to play the role of a transgender make-up artiste in the film in addition to being the make-up artiste for Amy Jackson. Mr. Asia contest participant Syed Siddiq appeared in the action sequences featuring Vikram.

Characterisation

In the film, Vikram plays the character called 'Lingesan', who considers Arnold Schwarzenegger as a role model and aspires to win the Mr. Tamil Nadu title. Shankar had crafted the hair style of Vikram by taking the front curl look of the younger Arnold Schwarzenegger as a reference. As per director Shankar, among all get-ups in the film, the hunchbacked man character was the most difficult one to sketch. Vikram was confirmed to sport his hunchbacked get-up in most parts of the film. The bubbles observed on the character's face were reported to be designed by Weta. Amy Jackson plays a model in the film. On casting and re-defining her looks Shankar was quoted saying, "I wanted someone who could authentically look like a model and then fixed Amy Jackson". Vikram also went bald for the film to change his looks in the film easier. Santhanam was also asked to lose some weight for his character. Peter Ming used actual cyclists in China for a cycle fight scene that was shot there.

Filming
Principal photography officially commenced on 15 July 2012 accompanying a poster photo shoot that featured Vikram and Jackson. The first schedule of filming was completed in Chennai by early September 2012. The main cast and crew were off to China for a 50-day schedule to shoot certain stunt scenes while some song sequences were also filmed at locales in the northern part of the Hunan province. The schedule in China was wrapped up by late November 2012. In an interview with The Times of India, one of the film's line producer, Bill Chang was quoted saying, "We worked closely with S. Shankar for nearly 50 days in 2012, during which his film was shot in nine different locations. The range of locations available in China is simply mind-boggling. No other country in the world has such variety of locales ranging from colored mountains to futuristic city landscapes." Scenes in the song "Pookkalae Sattru Oyivedungal" were shot in Red Seabeach in Panjin and on Li river in Guilin. The canned footage of the track was put on hold by the Chinese film processing studio for a year, due to settlement disputes with the producer.

In January 2013, a fight scene was filmed at an abandoned, 20-year-old factory in Chennai. Sixty percent of the shooting was completed by the end of the same month. By March 2013, four songs and three major action sequences were shot around China, Bangkok, Jodhpur, Kodaikanal, Pollachi and Chennai. In June 2013, a three-week filming schedule was completed in Bangalore, Mysore and Chennai, and 75% of the shooting was completed by July 2013. Filming was almost wrapped up by March 2014, with just one song sequence and patch-work for the film remaining. Shankar confirmed that the song would be shot after the film's audio launch. As per reports, a song of 5 minutes duration (later deciphered as "Ennodu Nee Irundhaal") was shot for 40 days. For filming the track, Vikram had gained a lot of weight of about 110 kg as he had to wear bulky costumes for the number. The song sequence was filmed at Prasad labs in Vadapalani, Chennai where a set was erected by Muthuraj. The climax train fight scene between Vikram and Upen Patel was shot in the railway stations of Chengalpattu, Visakhapatnam, Rayagada and Berhampur. On 24 September 2014, Jackson confirmed that the shooting of the film was completed.

Post-production
Due to the budget constraints, Venu Ravichandran had tightened the cost of the film, which led to several complications regarding its production. In February 2014, Vikram started dubbing for the first half of the film, and had completed within March 2014. On 3 April 2014, film critic and journalist Sreedhar Pillai stated that the film's trailer was in stages of editing. Patchwork and dubbing for the film was completed on 11 September 2014. The visual effects work began during mid-January 2014 and processed for more than 9 months, according to VFX supervisor Srinivas Mohan.

Music

A. R. Rahman composed the soundtrack album and background score for the film. The music of the Tamil version was launched at the Nehru Indoor Stadium in Chennai on 12 September 2014. Arnold Schwarzenegger, who was the inspiration of the character Lingesan, was invited as chief guest. The dubbed Hindi and Telugu versions of the soundtrack album were released on 31 December 2014.

Marketing
The first look title poster of the film was unveiled on 15 July 2012. Stills featuring the lead pair were released in March 2014. The official motion poster teaser of the film was released on YouTube on 8 September 2014. The motion poster crossed 1 million views by the third day of its release. Two posters released on 12 September 2014, with J. Hurtado of Twitch Film labelling them as "out of this world". The producer screened a sneak preview of the teaser and the song "Ennodu Nee Irundhaal" for the critics in late August 2014. The teaser carried a dummy music score that was not composed by A. R. Rahman.

The complete teaser trailer of the film was leaked on the internet on 2 September 2014. Although the leaked teaser lacked decipherability, the person who had leaked the teaser openly informed the team about it and challenged them to take action against him. After further inquiries, it was revealed that the culprit broke into producer Ravichandran's office during the night and had copied the teaser. However, Ravichandran refused to make changes to the leaked teaser, and planned to release it as per the original schedule.

The teaser was unveiled at the audio launch of the film. Hurtado in his teaser review wrote, "We see Vikram taking on multiple characters including a Quasimodo-type, kicking monstrous amounts of ass in various action sequences, running across water, riding a cyborg motorcycle, and dancing up a storm in some absurdly colorful backgrounds" and concluded by saying "Shankar is nothing if not a visual stylist, and it looks like he's pulling out all the stops for this one". Prajakta Hebbar of IBNLive wrote, "When we heard that Tamil filmmaker Shankar was making a new film, we fully expected it to be larger-than-life, with a funky storyline and starring popular actors. But what we didn't expect was that feeling of thrill and intrigue", asserting that "Vikram and Shankar have us hooked with the teaser". Nivedita Mishra of the Hindustan Times elaborated in her teaser review, "Without doubt, the film's special effects are great by any standards. Now, whether or not, they have been indigenously put together or have been outsourced from the West, the producers alone will know, but just the desire to make a film that gets its production value right yet doesn't overdo it, is good enough. Here's hoping it will ignite a desire among Indians to go for the skies." and praised the spectacular landscapes, edgy camera angles, action sequences before concluding that "Shankar has put in a lot of effort to make this magnum opus worth a watch if teasers are to go by." Behindwoods wrote, "Anyone who sees this remarkably impactful teaser would keep rewinding what he / she saw, to relive the experience over and over again." The teaser crossed 1 million views in just 12 hours of its release, making it the first Indian film to do so, beating the record set by the teaser of Bang Bang! (2014), which crossed 1 million views in 13 hours. It reached 7 million views in 2 weeks after its release, becoming the only Tamil film to cross the mark till date.

The making video of the film was released on 31 October 2014. The official trailer of the film was released on 17 December 2014. The Hindi-version of the trailer was attached with the prints of Aamir Khan-starrer PK (2014). Reviewing for the trailer, International Business Times stated: "The trailer which runs for two minutes will catch your breath for its wholesomeness. Revealing a very interesting or rather a fantasy type story with jaw dropping visuals, wonderful locations, thrilling stunts, beautiful heroine, colorful songs, multi-dimensional Vikram and above all great amount of hard work." The film was promoted by Vikram on Bigg Boss 8.

Release

Theatrical 
A report from International Business Times published during December 2013, stated about the release of I, which will hit theatres on the occasion of Tamil New Year (14 April 2014), thereby clashing with Rajinikanth-starrer Kochadaiyaan. However, the film was pushed due to production delays. In February 2014, trade circuits reported that the film will be scheduled for release on the summer of 2014 (May—June). During late-July 2014, it was further reported that the film will be releasing on the occasion of Diwali (22 October 2014), which was officially confirmed by the producers during August, in clash with Vijay's Kaththi and Vishal's Poojai. The date was later pushed due to extensive post-production and dubbing works. In November 2014, the producers officially announced that the film will release on the occasion of Pongal (15 January 2015). The release date was later finalised as 14 January 2015.

Prior to the release of the film, the Madras High Court passed an interim stay on the release till 30 January 2015, following a petition filed by Chennai-based Picturehouse Media Limited which alleged violation of financial and commercial agreements between the company and producers. However, Sreedhar Pillai, film critic and journalist had tweeted that the legal tussles between the two parties were solved amicably and announced that the film would release as planned.

Screenings and statistics 
The film was scheduled to be released in 15,000 screens across the world, with 10,000 screens being allotted for the Chinese and English dubbed versions of the film. But, the plan was later backed off. The film was released in 3000 screens worldwide, including the Tamil, dubbed Telugu and Hindi versions of the film. In Tamil Nadu, the film was screened in more than 400–500 screens. In Kerala, the film was premiered at more than 232 theatres, the highest release for a Tamil film in that state. In the United States, the film was showcased 400 screens including the Tamil, Telugu and Hindi versions. It was also showcased in other overseas countries, such as United Kingdom, Australia, New Zealand, Malaysia and Singapore. The Telugu and Hindi-dubbed version of the film screened a day after the Tamil version's release, 15 January 2015. It is the first Tamil film to be released in Pakistan.

The advance bookings for the film began on 11 January 2015, and saw a "tremendous response". On the evening of 11 January, the advance bookings began at Sathyam Cinemas and tickets for three days of the opening weekend, were almost sold out. The film also saw "solid booking" in major theatres such as AGS Entertainment's cinemas, PVR Cinemas' Sangam Theatre at R.K. Puram and the Abhirami theatre. Owing to the ticketing response, several single screens theatres, including Kasi theatre conducted a special early morning show for celebrities and noted VIP personalities.

Distribution 
In September 2014, Sushma Cine Arts announced that they have acquired the Tamil Nadu theatrical rights. The Kerala theatrical rights were sold to Global United Media. AGS Entertainment acquired the theatrical distribution rights in the Chennai and Chengalpet regions.

Home media
The media rights included satellite rights and ringtones.

Reception

Box office

India
According to Box Office India, I earned around  nett in South India on its first day, setting records in Kerala and Telangana/AP. The film grossed over  worldwide on its opening day. The film went on to collect  nett in India in three days from all its versions.

In its extended five-day weekend, the film earned  nett in India from all three versions, with the Hindi version netting .

The film grossed around  worldwide from all versions twelve days after its release.

According to Andhra Box Office, the film had collected  worldwide and eventually became a commercial success. The final domestic net(India net) collections were 148.65 crore. In crores final domestic net collections were 148.65 crore, domestic gross 185 crore and worldwide 239.35 crore.

Other territories
I grossed US$697,346 in Tamil version and US$10,373 in dubbed Hindi version in USA in its first weekend. I(Tamil) grossed US$201,207 and I(Hindi) grossed US$4,009 in Canada in its first weekend. I(Tamil) grossed US$258,764 in UK-Ireland in first weekend. I(Tamil) grossed MYR 2,162,742 in Malaysia in first weekend. In first 10 days, I(Tamil) grossed US$789,298 in USA, US$323,714 in Canada, MYR 3,146,295 in Malaysia. In first 17 days, I(Tamil) grossed £386,542 in UK-Ireland and MYR 3,404,582 in Malaysia.

Critical response
I received mostly positive reviews from critics with praise for Shankar's direction, the performances (especially Vikram, Suresh Gopi and Amy Jackson), the technical aspects of the film (especially the visual effects, cinematography, costume design and makeup), and A.R. Rahman's soundtrack and background score, though the length, pace and editing received some criticism. 

On review aggregator website Rotten Tomatoes the movie has an approval score of 56% on the basis of 9 reviews with an average rating of 5.7 out of 10.

Variety magazine's Ronnie Scheib wrote, "Shankar's visual ingenuity keeps things zippy for much of the hefty 188-minute running time, and star Chiyaan Vikram delivers a knockout three-pronged performance, but this cinematic bravura is offset by underdeveloped scripting, flatly one-dimensional villains and overdone lone-hero-vs.-swarms-of-murderous-attackers setpieces". Rachel Saltz from The New York Times wrote, "I is exuberant and unselfconscious but too cartoonish to engage your emotions. The onslaught of images and music will engage your senses, though, even as you're left giggling at the too-muchness of it all". J Hurtado from Twitch Film wrote, "I strains the boundaries of self-indulgence and modern tolerance in a way that has become something of a plague among Indian blockbusters. The film is amazing to look at, features a number of amazing set pieces, and some appropriately over the top action sequences, but even with everything including a few kitchen sinks thrown in, it may go on a bit too long for its own good". Subhash K. Jha gave 4 stars out of 5 describing I as the "most exceptional" film from Shankar and wrote that it "takes us beyond the imaginable and the conceivable, fusing with fabulous flamboyance the fantasy element with a level of heightened reality that's commercial cinema's forte". Filmfare also gave it 4 stars out of 5, stating that "Shankar balances a social critique along with technical gimmickry and here the message centres about our obsession with physical perfection and beauty." Komal Nahta felt that Shankar's direction was "first rate" and wrote "His vision is unique and the translation of his vision on to the celluloid is brilliant. He has kept the narration so interesting that the viewer's eyes remain glued to the screen. He has given the film a huge canvas and has made it an audio-visual treat. Rajeev Masand from IBN Live gave 3 out of 5 and wrote, "I from visionary Tamil director Shankar is a work of staggering ambition, somewhat weighed down by the filmmaker's own indulgence...(it) may be far from perfect, but for the most part it's pretty entertaining stuff". The Times of India gave it 3.5 stars out of 5 and wrote, "Shot mesmerisingly by PC Sreeram on virgin locales in China and India, with world class CG work, this spectacle works because at the core, it's a romantic-thriller told simplistically....This is pure escapist fare but will resonate with those who read fairy tales at bedtime". Rediff gave 3.5 stars out of 5 and wrote, "The narrative lacks the pace; we usually associate with a Shankar's film. But he does tell a beautiful tale of love sullied by jealousies, greed and anger. The intriguing screenplay as the director alternates between the light-hearted past and the thrilling present keeps you engrossed". Behindwoods.com rated the film 3 out of 5 and stated, "though the story is predictable beyond a point, it's an amalgamation of 'Masters' at play which works to a larger extent because of their huge efforts". India Today rated the film 3 out of and wrote "It's not everyday you will get to watch a visually rich movie like this".

The Hindu stated, "Vikram's terrific performance is let down by an uninspired, exhausting movie". Daily News & Analysis gave the film 3 out of 5 stars, too, calling it a "great looking film but with shoddy writing and poorly sketched characters". Haricharan Pudipeddi, writing for IANS, rated the film 2 out of 5 and said, "All that's big may not necessarily be great. Hope Shankar realises that much better films can be made on a smaller canvas and much lower budget." Sify wrote, "I is definitely not the best of Shankar and he has to take the blame for poor writing. His story is predictable and there are no twists or scenes which keeps you engaged. Barring few eye-popping stunt scenes, a slew of beautiful unseen locations, breathtaking camera by PC Sreeram and few hummable songs by AR Rahman, I is very ordinary". Deccan Chronicle gave the film 2.5 stars out of 5 and said, "While the movie and the effort is good technically, its content is just average". Oneindia also rated the film 2.5 out of 5 saying, "For a movie which had so much of anticipation, I doesn't feed its audience enough to fulfill their expectations. The story is plain and doesn't look like a normal Shankar movie which would otherwise have interesting twists and turns." Gautaman Bhaskaran, writing for The Hindustan Times, rated the film two and a half stars, stating that Vikram's performance was the film's "only high point"; he noted that the film had similarities to the novel The Hunchback of Notre-Dame (1831) and the fairy tale Beauty and the Beast (1756), "without infusing any novelty into these age-old yarns." Deepanjana Pal from Firstpost wrote, "I is too long, too stupid and too regressive to be entertaining" and also called it "superficial and the least fun Shankar film ever".

Accolades

Notes

References

External links
 
 
 

2015 films
2015 action thriller films
Bodybuilding films
Films shot in Bangkok
Films shot in China
Films shot in Bangalore
Films shot in Rajasthan
Indian romantic thriller films
Indian romantic action films
Indian nonlinear narrative films
Films directed by S. Shankar
Films about trans women
Films scored by A. R. Rahman
2010s Tamil-language films
Films shot in Mysore
Films shot in Chennai
Films set in China
Indian films about revenge